The Milch Trial (officially, The United States of America vs. Erhard Milch) was the second of the twelve trials for war crimes the U.S. authorities held in their occupation zone in Germany in Nuremberg after the end of World War II. These twelve trials were all held before U.S. military courts, not before the International Military Tribunal, but took place in the same rooms at the Palace of Justice. The twelve U.S. trials are collectively known as the "Subsequent Nuremberg Trials" or, more formally, as the "Trials of War Criminals before the Nuremberg Military Tribunals" (NMT).

In the Milch trial, former Generalfeldmarschall of the Luftwaffe Erhard Milch was accused of having committed war crimes and crimes against humanity. The indictment was presented on November 14, 1946. The charges against Milch were summarized by Michael A. Musmanno (one of the tribunal judges) as follows:
Erhard Milch is charged with having knowingly committed war crimes as principal and accessory in enterprises involving slave labor and having also willingly and knowingly participated in enterprises involving the use of prisoners of war in war operations contrary to international convention and the laws and customs of war.
The defendant is accused of having knowingly and willfully participated in enterprises involving fatal medical experiments upon subjects without their consent.
In the third count the defendant is charged with responsibility for slave labor and fatal medical experiments, in the same manner as indicated in the first two counts, except that here the alleged victims are declared to be German nationals and nationals of other countries.

The judges in his case, heard before Military Tribunal II, were Robert M. Toms (presiding judge) from Detroit, Michigan, Fitzroy Donald Phillips from North Carolina, Michael A. Musmanno from Pittsburgh, Pennsylvania, and John J. Speight from Alabama (as an alternate judge). The Chief of Counsel for the Prosecution was Telford Taylor, and the Chief Trial Counsel was Clark Denney.  The assistant counsel for the prosecution included James S. Conway, Dorothy M. Hunt, Henry T. King, Jr., Raymond J. McMahon, Jr., and Maurice C. Myers. The defense counsels were Friedrich Bergold and Werner Milch (the brother of the defendant).

Milch pleaded "not guilty" on all charges on December 20, 1946. The trial lasted from January 2, 1947 until April 17, 1947. The tribunal found Milch guilty on counts 1 and 3, but acquitted him on count 2 of the indictment. On April 17, 1947, Milch was sentenced to life imprisonment at Rebdorf Prison, near Munich. The sentence was commuted by John J. McCloy, High Commissioner of Germany, to 15 years of imprisonment in 1951. Milch was paroled in June 1954.

During his incarceration, Milch filed an application for leave to file a petition for a writ of habeas corpus before the United States Supreme Court.  The Court denied leave on jurisdictional grounds by a vote of 4-4, with four justices (Black, Douglas, Murphy, and Rutledge) voting for a full hearing on the issue of jurisdiction, and Justice Robert H. Jackson, who was the lead prosecutor during the Nuremberg war crimes trials, recusing himself.

References 

Ismael Sambrano

External links 
Description of the trial from the U.S. Holocaust Memorial Museum.
A sourced collection of excerpts from documents relating to medical experiments, in particular low pressure (high altitude) and freezing experiments.

United States Nuremberg Military Tribunals
1947 in Germany